Dennis Chin (born 4 June 1987) is a Jamaican professional footballer who plays  as a forward.

Club career

Youth and college
Chin was born in Kingston, Jamaica to a Jamaican mother and a Chinese Jamaican father. He moved to the US when he was ten and attended Oviedo High School, before playing college soccer at Rollins College from 2005 through 2009. He scored 7 goals and 3 assists in each of his junior and senior years (2008 and 2009). During his time at Rollins, he also played for the Central Florida Kraze of the USL Premier Development League from 2005 to 2010.

Orlando City

Chin signed with Orlando City of the USL Professional Division in 2011. He made his professional debut on 14 May 2011, coming on as a second-half substitute in a 1–0 win over the Pittsburgh Riverhounds. He then scored a goal and provided two assists in their first round match in the 2011 Lamar Hunt US Open Cup, in a 4–0 win over ASC New Stars. After spending the early portion of the 2011 season learning Orlando City Head Coach Adrian Heath's system, Chin came alive in the later part of the campaign and became known as the super-sub. As a result, the speedster ended his rookie season with four goals, two of which came during the Lions' memorable three-game playoff run, which saw the club secure its first USL PRO Championship.

In December 2011, Orlando signed Chin to a contract extension through the 2014 season.

Moving into his second season, Chin's confident play towards the end of his rookie year certainly carried over into his second term with the club. Dennis transitioned from his super-sub role, held in year one, to become the primary goal-scorer for the Lions. Chin's first goal came just three minutes into their first game of the season against the Charlotte Eagles, and would set the tone for the kind of year he was about to embark on. All season long, Chin's pace and finishing ability caused problems for opposing teams' back lines and led to the striker scoring 11 goals during league play, which was a team record. Those 11 goals were also good for best in the league and saw Chin finish as Top Goal Scorer and Scoring Champion (27 points) of the USL Pro in only his second season as a professional. In addition, Chin also notched three assists during league play and also scored in the Lamar Hunt US Open Cup against Major League Soccer club Sporting Kansas City.

Chin's impressive play led to the Oviedo native being named to the USL Pro All-League first team, while also being nominated for USL Pro Most Valuable Player (MVP) and Central Florida Athlete of the Year. Dennis also accepted invitations to train with MLS sides Chicago Fire and D.C. United during the 2012 off-season.

In his third year with Orlando City, Chin was once again an integral part of the Lions' Championship run. After notching five goals and five assists in the regular season, Chin was lethal in the playoffs and recorded four goals and three assists, in three games played, leading the USL Pro playoffs in both categories. Two of those four goals were scored in the USL Pro Championship match and helped Orlando City secure its second USL Pro title, after being upset by the Wilmington Hammerheads in the year prior. He left the club upon the conclusion of the 2014 season, before the club's transition to Major League Soccer.

Arizona United
After exploring some opportunities in Europe, Chin ultimately signed with another USL team, Arizona United SC. He ended up scoring in the first two matches of 2015.

Ottawa Fury
In December 2015, Chin signed with Canadian NASL club Ottawa Fury FC. Playing in multiple different positions, Chin scored one goal for Ottawa in 17 appearances in all competitions, including seven starts.

Ironi Nesher
On August 26, 2016 he was transferred to recently promoted Israeli second division club Ironi Nesher. He helped Nesher to avoid relegation, leading the club in goals and assists.

Pittsburgh Riverhounds SC
On February 23, 2018, Chin joined the Pittsburgh Riverhounds SC of the United Soccer League. After missing the start of the year with injury, Chin helped the Riverhounds to the 2018 USL Championship Playoffs.

Richmond Kickers
On January 7, 2019, Chin joined the Richmond Kickers of the USL League One as a player/assistant coach.

Personal life
Chin's great grandparents came from Guangdong, China and they are Hakka. His last name is the Hakka variant of 陈 (corresponding to the Cantonese Chan and Mandarin Chen).

Honours

Orlando City
 USL Pro Championship 2011
 USL Pro Commissioner's Cup 2011
 USL Pro Commissioner's Cup 2012
 USL Pro Top Goal Scorer 2012
 USL Pro Scoring Champion 2012
 USL Pro First Team All-League 2012
 USL Pro MVP Candidate 2012
 Central Florida Athlete of the Year Nominee 2012
 USL Pro Championship 2013
 USL Pro Commissioner's Cup 2014

References

External links
 
 

1987 births
Living people
Jamaican footballers
Jamaican expatriate footballers
Jamaican people of Chinese descent
African-American people
American sportspeople of Chinese descent
Association football forwards
Expatriate footballers in Israel
Expatriate soccer players in Canada
Expatriate soccer players in the United States
Hakka sportspeople
Ironi Nesher F.C. players
North American Soccer League players
Orlando City SC (2010–2014) players
Orlando City U-23 players
Ottawa Fury FC players
Phoenix Rising FC players
Pittsburgh Riverhounds SC players
Richmond Kickers players
Rollins College alumni
Rollins Tars men's soccer players
San Antonio Scorpions players
Soccer players from Florida
USL League One players
USL League Two players